Bechir Ben Saïd (born 29 November 1992) is a Tunisian professional football goalkeeper who currently plays for US Monastir.

International career 
At the end of 2021, when he had never played for the Tunisian team, he was selected to participate in the 2021 FIFA Arab Cup organized in Qatar. During this competition, he officiates as a substitute goalkeeper and does not play any matches. Tunisia lost in the final against Algeria.

He was later named into the Tunisian squad yet again for the 2021 Africa Cup of Nations in Cameroon, with initial expectation to be a substitute goalkeeper, he ended up being the main keeper of Tunisia throughout the group stage as Tunisia had a somewhat disappointing performance, only qualified as one of the best third-placed team with one lone win.

Honours 
US Monastir

 Tunisian Cup: 2019–20
 Tunisian Super Cup: 2019–20

Tunisia

 FIFA Arab Cup runner up: 2021

References

External links

1992 births
Living people
Tunisian footballers
AS Gabès players
US Monastir (football) players
Association football goalkeepers
Tunisian Ligue Professionnelle 1 players
2021 Africa Cup of Nations players
2022 FIFA World Cup players